Kwasi Annoh Ankama (1 June 1957 – 1 July 2010) was a Ghanaian lawyer and politician. He was a Member of Parliament of the Atiwa constituency and a member of the New Patriotic Party. He died while in office on an official delegation to London. He was succeeded as MP by Kwesi Amoako Atta.

Early life and education
Kwasi Ankama was born at Abomosu in the Eastern Region of Ghana. He obtained a Bachelor of Arts degree in Law and Political Science from the University of Ghana, Legon, in 1984. He then proceeded to the Ghana School of Law, Makola, graduating in 1986. He obtained a post-graduate diploma in Housing Law from the University of London in 1997.

Career and political life
Annoh Ankama worked as a lawyer and was a Special Assistant to President John Agyekum Kufour.

In 2008, he contested and won the Atiwa constituency election by obtaining 26,423 votes out of the 34,570 valid votes cast, representing 76.4 percent of the vote. Annoh Ankama served on various parliamentary committees, including the Subsidiary Legislation Committee, Judiciary Committee, and Local Government and Rural Development Committee of Parliament.

His parliamentary seat was declared vacant on 7 July 2010 by Joyce Bamford-Addo, the then Speaker of Parliament. A by-election held to fill the vacant seat was won by Kwesi Amoako Atta.

Personal life
Annoh Ankama was married with three children. He was a Christian and a member of the Catholic Church in Ghana.

Death
In June 2010, Annoh Ankama was part of an official government delegation that traveled to the United Kingdom for political consultations. He fell ill during the trip and was taken to a hospital in London, but died while receiving treatment on July 1. His body was returned to Ghana for burial on August 20, and interred later that month.

References

1957 births
2010 deaths
20th-century Ghanaian lawyers
Ghanaian MPs 2009–2013
New Patriotic Party politicians
People from Eastern Region (Ghana)
University of Ghana alumni
Ghana School of Law alumni
Ghanaian Roman Catholics